Anna Ascends is a 1922 American silent romantic drama film directed by Victor Fleming, and based on the 1920 play of the same title by Harry Chapman Ford. Alice Brady reprises her starring role from the Broadway play. The film is largely lost, with only a six-minute fragment still in existence.

Overview
The Broadway play is about a working class Syrian American waitress who through hard work "ascends" the social and economic ladder and becomes successful in the United States. The playwright Henry Chapman Ford loosely based his play on a real-life Syrian immigrant waitress in Boston named Anna Ayyoub, who mesmerized him. In his book, The Arab Americans: A History, writer Gregory Orfalea describes Ford's inspiration by quoting him, "Their family life, their clean way of living impressed me and I decided that the Americanization of such a race was a big factor in making the "melting pot" one of the greatest nations of history". Ford went on: "I figured here is a people who could read and write probably 6,000 years before the northern 'blue eyes'. Here is a race who had a fine culture along with the great Egyptian dynasties, and as criminology seems to be a statistical fad at the present writing, here are a people who have less, en ratio, in prisons, than any other in the world. Hence, I figured, why not write a Syrian drama, a virgin field, anent the Syrians?"

Cast
Alice Brady as Anna Ayyob
Robert Ellis as Howard Fisk
David Powell as The Baron
Nita Naldi as Countess Rostoff
Charles K. Gerrard as Count Rostoff
Edouard Durand as Siad Coury (credited as Edward Durand)
Florence Dixon as Bessie Fisk
Grace Griswold as Miss Fisk
Frederick Burton as Mr. Fisk
Benjamin De Casseres as City Editor

References

External links

1922 films
1922 romantic drama films
American romantic drama films
American silent feature films
American black-and-white films
Famous Players-Lasky films
American films based on plays
Films directed by Victor Fleming
Paramount Pictures films
Lost American films
1922 lost films
Lost romantic drama films
1920s American films
Silent romantic drama films
Silent American drama films